Philip Milner Oliver CBE (20 August 1884 – 12 April 1954) was a radical British Liberal Party politician in the United Kingdom who served for two short terms as Member of Parliament (MP) for Manchester Blackley.

Background
He was born in Manchester, the son of J. R. Oliver. He was educated at Bowdon College, Manchester Grammar School and Corpus Christi College, Oxford where he received a Bachelor of Arts. He qualified as a Barrister-at-law.

Career
In 1909 he was called to the Bar by Lincoln's Inn and practised on the Northern Circuit. In 1914, at the age of 30, he was selected as Liberal party prospective parliamentary candidate for the Knutsford division of Cheshire. This was a Unionist seat that the Liberal had only ever won once, in 1906. The outbreak of war postponed the general election. During the war he served as Honorary County Secretary of the East Lancashire Branch of the British Red Cross Society. 
He was Liberal candidate for the newly created constituency of Manchester Blackley at the 1918 General Election. He expressed support for David Lloyd George and his Coalition Government, as did his Unionist opponent. As a result, the Coalition Government partners agreed not to jointly endorse either candidate. He came third, behind the Labour candidate;

In a special Honours list of 1920 he was made a Commander of the Order of the British Empire (CBE) for his wartime work with the British Red Cross Society, in 1918 he had been made an Officer of the Order (OBE).
Oliver served as Honorary Secretary of the Manchester Liberal Federation. Oliver, along with the overwhelming majority of Manchester Liberals decided to oppose the Coalition Government that had become more dominated by Unionists. He was retained as Liberal candidate for the 1922 General Election, at which he overtook the Labour candidate to finish second;

In 1923 he had published Whatsoever Things, Fugitive Essays on the Foundations of Democracy. When Stanley Baldwin became Unionist Prime Minister in 1923, he decided to call an election to be fought on the issue of his desire to introduce taxes on imports. Manchester was an area which was known to oppose such measures in its support for Free Trade. Both of Manchester's free trade parties, Liberal and Labour, sought electoral co-operation. As a result, no Labour candidate stood at Blackley, helping Oliver to gain the seat;

By 1924, with a Labour government in office the political climate had changed and Labour fielded a candidate against Oliver at the general election. This helped ensure the Unionist regained the seat;

By the time of the 1929 General Election, Oliver and the Manchester Liberals were at the forefront of the party's radical platform, and despite the presence of a Labour candidate, he was able to re-gain his Blackley seat from the Unionist;

In 1931, following the financial crisis that resulted in the Labour government being replaced by an all-party National Government, Oliver supported the leadership of Sir Herbert Samuel, who had led the Liberal party into the National Government. At the following general election, the Conservatives in Manchester chose to split the National Government vote by standing against sitting Liberal MPs. One of the main issues of the election was Free trade v Import tariffs, as had been the case in 1923. However, unlike then, the Labour party in Manchester chose to split the free trade vote and Oliver thus found himself in a three-way contest and lost his seat;

In 1933 he was parachuted in to be the Liberal candidate at the 1933 Altrincham by-election. This was a Conservative seat that the Liberals had last won in 1923. At the 1931 General Election the Altrincham Liberals had decided not to split the National Government vote and the Conservative was returned unopposed. Nationally, the Liberals had resigned their offices in the National Government but continued to sit on the government benches. At a difficult time for the party, Oliver was able to retain the party position and share of the vote when compared to the 1929 election figures;

In 1933 he had published Genesis to Geneva, an essay. By 1935, the Liberal party had moved into opposition to the National Government and Oliver fought the election in direct opposition to his Conservative opponent. However, the Labour party again chose to stand, splitting the anti-government vote and allowing the Conservative to win again;

In 1936 he was elected to serve on the Liberal Party Council. In 1939 Oliver had been re-selected as Liberal prospective parliamentary candidate for Blackley. A general election was expected to take place sometime in 1939 and there was some support in the Labour party, not to oppose Liberal candidates who were better placed to defeat Conservative candidates. This feeling was in line with Sir Stafford Cripps advocating a Popular Front to defeat the National Government. In 1939, the Blackley Labour party had no candidate in place. Thus Oliver would have been particularly confident of making a return to parliament. However, the outbreak of war postponed the elections until 1945.
In 1944 he had published Back to Balfour on the subject of a Jewish state as promised in the Balfour Declaration.
In 1945 Oliver, now 60 years old, was again the Liberal candidate for Blackley, but the political climate had changed and Labour swept to victory both locally and nationally;

Oliver did not stand for parliament again. He died in 1954 aged 69.

External links to publications
Genesis to Geneva: https://books.google.com/books?id=eabEHAAACAAJ&dq=genesis+to+Geneva+oliver&hl=en&sa=X&ei=AG_mUpLtO4Tn7AatgoDwAg&ved=0CEMQ6AEwAA
Whatsoever Things: https://books.google.com/books?id=WJgfMwEACAAJ&dq=inauthor:%22Philip+Milner+Oliver%22&hl=en&sa=X&ei=rG_mUte0KIWe7Aa54oDYDQ&ved=0CEwQ6AEwBg 
Back to Balfour:https://books.google.com/books?id=a5kunQEACAAJ&dq=inauthor:%22Philip+Milner+Oliver%22&hl=en&sa=X&ei=rG_mUte0KIWe7Aa54oDYDQ&ved=0CEcQ6AEwBQ

References

1884 births
1954 deaths
Commanders of the Order of the British Empire
Liberal Party (UK) MPs for English constituencies
UK MPs 1923–1924
UK MPs 1929–1931
Alumni of Corpus Christi College, Oxford